Spleen United is a Danish electronic rock band consisting of the brothers Bjarke (Vocals/Guitar) and Gaute Niemann (Bass/ Synth), Kasper Nørlund (Synth/Backing vocals), Rune Wehner (Synth) and Janus Nevel Ringsted (Drums). It was formed in Århus, Denmark in 2002.

The band's debut album Godspeed into the Mainstream was released in 2006. Their second album Neanderthal was released on 21 January 2008 and the singles were (in order) "My Tribe", "Suburbia", "66", and "Failure 1977". Surburbia is remixed by Juan Maclean and other remixers count VHS or BETA.

From 16 to 17 April 2010, Spleen United held a non-stop 24-hour improv session - from sunset to sunset. They put up a mini-site (http://www.sunsettosunset.com/) with a number of puzzles that, if solved, give you an exclusive premiere of a video, and more prizes.

On 30 January 2012 the band released their highly anticipated third album entitled School of Euphoria. 
The band itself states that it is the most poppy album released by them so far.

After a somewhat tumultuous performance at NorthSide Festival in June 2013, the band announced they would not be playing together any time in the near future, although they did not officially break up. Frontman Bjarke Niemann went on to form the band Lightwave Empire.

In 2019, the band reformed in the original lineup to play the Roskilde Festival.

Discography

Studio albums

Singles 
"Heroin Unlimited" (2005)
"In Peak Fitness Condition" (2005)
"Spleen United" (2006)
"She Falls in Love with Machines"
"My Tribe" (2007)
"Suburbia" (2008)
"66"
"Failure 1977" (2008)
"Sunset to Sunset" (2010)
"Days of Thunder" (2011)
"Misery" (2012) (feat Gitte Nielsen)
"Euphoria" (2012) (feat Sharin Foo)

References

External links 
 Official site
 Copenhagen Records page for Spleen United
 Myspace profile
 Facebook profile
 

Musical groups established in 2003
Danish pop music groups
Danish rock music groups
Danish synthpop groups
Danish electronic rock musical groups